Lawrence Booth (born 2 April 1975) is an author and a cricket writer for the Daily Mail and the Mail on Sunday, and editor of Wisden Cricketers' Almanack since 2011. He was the youngest Wisden editor for 72 years when he was appointed. He has previously written for The Guardian, The Observer and The Sunday Times, and is a regular contributor to Wisden Cricket Monthly magazine. He wrote guardian.co.uk's The Spin column for seven years, and his Top Spin column for Mail Online was named Online Column of the Year at the 2010 Sports Journalists' Association awards. In March 2013, he won Scoop of the Year at the SJAs after revealing that Kevin Pietersen had sent text messages to the touring South Africans the previous summer. He has written, edited or co-written 15 books, including Arm-Ball to Zooter, Cricket, Lovely Cricket? and the last 11 editions of Wisden, including the 150th, published in 2013.

References

1975 births
Living people
Cricket historians and writers
Editors of Wisden Cricketers' Almanack